Hopewell Township, Ohio, may refer to:
Hopewell Township, Licking County, Ohio
Hopewell Township, Mercer County, Ohio
Hopewell Township, Muskingum County, Ohio
Hopewell Township, Perry County, Ohio
Hopewell Township, Seneca County, Ohio

Ohio township disambiguation pages